is a Japanese voice actor and narrator from Ibaraki Prefecture. He is represented by Arts Vision.

He is most known for the roles of Kamille Bidan (Mobile Suit Zeta Gundam), Albert Heinrich/004 (Cyborg 009 (2001)), and Sueo Maruo (Chibi Maruko-chan). His debut role is Bob in the 1982 anime television series Cybot Robotchi. He has also voiced many characters for the story CDs in Sound Horizon.

Filmography

Television animation
1982
Cybot Robotchi (Bob)
1983
Captain Tsubasa (Ken Wakashimazu)
1985
Mobile Suit Zeta Gundam (Kamille Bidan)
1986
Mobile Suit Gundam ZZ (Kamille Bidan)
1987
Ai no Wakakusa Monogatari (Little Women) (Theodore "Laurie" Laurence)
1991
Goldfish Warning! (Aoi)
1993
Mobile Suit Victory Gundam (Mathis Walker)
1994
Mobile Fighter G Gundam (Ulube Ishikawa)
1995
Fushigi Yūgi (Tomo)
1996
Rurouni Kenshin (Takeda Kanryū)
2001
Cyborg 009 (Albert Heinrich/004)
Dennō Bōkenki Webdiver (Daitalion)
Kirby of the Stars (Cook Kawasaki, Kabu, Kine, Samo, Additional Voices)
PaRappa the Rapper (Paddle)
2002
GetBackers (Kuroudou Akabane)
Kiddy Grade (Sinistra)
Naruto (Ebisu)
2004
Transformers Superlink (Nightscream, Signal Flare, Sprung, Buildron)
Sgt. Frog (Viper)
2005
Oh My Goddess! (Toshiyuki Aoshima)
2006
Bleach (Narrator, Kurodo, Michel)
Code Geass (Clovis La Britannia)
Oh My Goddess! Sorezore no Tsubasa (Toshiyuki Aoshima)
2008
Persona -trinity soul- (Kimoto Yūji)
Slayers REVOLUTION (Zuuma)
2010
Hakuouki (Yamanami Keisuke "Sannan-san")
2011
Shakugan no Shana III -FINAL- (Dantalion)
Shiki (Hayami)
2012
Accel World (Black Vise)
JoJo's Bizarre Adventure (Straizo)
One Piece (Pekoms)
2013
Hunter × Hunter (Second Series) - Meleoron
Saint Seiya Omega (Apsu)
Samurai Flamenco (Narration)
Tokyo Ravens (Ashiya Douman)
DokiDoki! PreCure (Leva)
2014
Akatsuki no Yona: Yona of the Dawn (Kan Soo-jin)
M3 the dark metal (Natsuiri)
2015
One-Punch Man (Sitch)
Shirobako (Sugesuke Enjō)
Mr. Osomatsu (Dayōn)
Plastic Memories (Takao Yamonobe)
The Asterisk War (Shuma Sakon)
2016
Beyblade Burst (Principal Hidetaro Shinoda)
D.Gray-man Hallow (Sheril Kamelot)
The Great Passage (Professor Oda)
Re:Zero − Starting Life in Another World (Petelgeuse's Finger (Man 2))
2017
Saga of Tanya the Evil (Adelheid von Schugel)
Clockwork Planet (Governor)
Kono Subarashii Sekai ni Shukufuku wo! 2 (Keele)
Atom: The Beginning (Han Shunsaku)
Mahojin Guru Guru (Kaya (ep. 3, 6, 8, 10, 14 - 19, 21 - 23))
Street Fighter V (Zeku)
2018
Darling in the Franxx (Papa)
Xuan Yuan Sword Luminary (Assassin)
Tokyo Ghoul (Shiki Kijima)
Sirius the Jaeger (Klarwein)
2019
Domestic Girlfriend (Akihito Fujii)
GeGeGe no Kitarō 6th series (Vampire La Seine (ep. 57))
Isekai Quartet (Adelheid von Schugel)
Phantasy Star Online 2: Episode Oracle as Gettemhart
Revisions (Seiichirō Muta)
One Piece (Ashura Doji)
2020
ID: Invaded  (Nishio Shirakoma)
In/Spectre (Kodama no Genichirō)
Pet (Company President)
BNA: Brand New Animal (Dante)
2021
Mieruko-chan (Junji Rōsoku)
The Faraway Paladin (Gus)
Yashahime: Princess Half-Demon (Shōgen Mamiana)
2022
Detective Conan: Zero's Tea Time (Yuya Kazami)
2023
My Love Story with Yamada-kun at Lv999 (Takezo Kamota)

Unknown date
Bola Kampung (Santokh)
Bonobono (Shimatchū Oji-san, other voices)
Brave Police J-Decker (Neuva Fahrzeug)
Chibi Maruko-chan (Sueo Maruo)
Detective School Q (Yutaka Saburōmaru)
Digimon Xros Wars (Mad Leomon)
DokiDoki! PreCure (Leva)
Durarara!!x2 Shō (Jinnai Yodogiri)
Makai Senki Disgaea (Captain Gordon)
Earthian (Hoshino)
FAKE (Randy "Ryo" MacLean)
Finder no Hyouteki - ANIMIX (Feilong Liu)Fish in the Trap (Kawakara)Flame of Recca (Domon Ishijima)Gankutsuou (Baptistin)Hellsing Ultimate (The Major)Hiwou War Chronicles (Sai)I Can Hear the Sea (Taku Morisaki)Kaito Joker (Mister Kaneari)Konjiki no Gash Bell!! (Shin'ichi)Madara (Shamon)Magician's Academy (Hapsiel)Martian Successor Nadesico (Seiya Uribatake)Rockman EXE (Raoul)Microman (Edison)Miracle Girls (Kōhei Yamagishi)Mobile Suit Gundam SEED Astray (Rondo Ghina Sahaku)Naruto (Ebisu, Zetsu)Naruto: Shippuden (Ebisu, Zetsu, White Zetsu Army, Guruguru)Nobunagun (Oda Nobunaga)Okane ga nai (Kaoruko Someya)Otaku no Video (Yamaguchi)Please Save My Earth (Daisuke Dobashi and Hiiragi)Saber Marionette J, Saber Marionette J Again Saber Marionette J to X (Obiichi Soemon and Yang Ming)Sailor Moon (Jinta Araki (114), Yamagishi (145), Honjo (154))Sailor Moon Supers: The Movie (Poupelin)Saint Seiya (Aries Shion)Samurai Deeper Kyo (Fubuki)SoltyRei (Ashley Links)Sohryuden: Legend of the Dragon Kings (Tsuzuku Ryudo)Super Milk Chan (Dr. Eyepatch)Tekkaman Blade (both Pegas and Tekkaman Dagger)Tekkaman Blade II (Pegas II)The Marshmallow Times (Nats)Tokimeki Memorial Only Love (Misao Kurotokage)Uta Kata (Sei Tōdō)Transformers SuperLink (Nightscream)Wan Wan Serebu Soreyuke! Tetsunoshin (Doppel)Yu-Gi-Oh! (Kiwami Warashibe)YuYu Hakusho (Suzaku)Zaion: I Wish You Were Here (Mitsuo Satake)

Original net animation (ONA)The Way of the Househusband (2021) (Urita)

Original video animation (OVA)Choujin Locke - Lord Leon (1989) (Locke)Mobile Suit Gundam 0083: Stardust Memory (1991) (Karius)Kingyo Chūihō! Genkijirusi no Nakanatachi  (1991) (Aoi)Kimera (1996) (Kimera)Hellsing (Major)

Theatrical animationInuyasha the Movie: Fire on the Mystic Island (2004) (Kyōra)Dead Leaves (2004) (Chinko Drill)Mobile Suit Zeta Gundam: A New Translation - Heirs to the Stars (2005) (Kamille Bidan)Mobile Suit Zeta Gundam: A New Translation II - Lovers (2005) (Kamille Bidan)Mobile Suit Zeta Gundam: A New Translation III - Love is the Pulse of the Stars (2006) (Kamille Bidan)Road to Ninja: Naruto the Movie (2012) (Zetsu)Detective Conan: The Darkest Nightmare (2016) (Yuya Kazami)Fireworks, Should We See It from the Side or the Bottom? (2017)Detective Conan: Zero the Enforcer (2018) (Yuya Kazami)Mr. Osomatsu: The Movie (2019) (Dayōn)Blackfox (2019) (Lauren)Crayon Shin-chan: Crash! Rakuga Kingdom and Almost Four Heroes (2020)Princess Principal: Crown Handler Movie 1 (2021) (Bishop/Mr. Winston)Mr. Osomatsu: Hipipo-Zoku to Kagayaku Kajitsu (2022) (Dayōn)

Video gamesKingyo Chūihō! Tobidase! Game Gakuen (1994) (Aoi)Angelique (1994) (Lumiale)Ayumayu Gekijou (2001) (Ibuki Jun)Ore no Shita de Agake (2002) (Yukio Yamaguchi)Final Fantasy XII (2006) (Vayne Solidor)Tales of Berseria (2016) (Melchior)Street Fighter V (2017) (Zeku)Mega Man 11 (2018) (Dr. Light and Auto)Fate/Grand Order (2022) (Don Quixote)SD Gundam Battle Alliance (2022) (Kamille Bidan)
Unknown dateAnother Century's Episode series (Kamille Bidan)BioShock Infinite (Cornelius Slate)Call of Duty: Black Ops (Friedrich Steiner)Captain Tsubasa 5: Hasha no Shogo Campione (Ken Wakashimazu)Disgaea: Hour of Darkness (Captain Gordon)Everybody's Golf 2 (Ben)Final Fantasy X-2 (Logos)Hakuoki Shinsengumi Kitan (Sannan Keisuke)Hakuoki Shinsengumi Kitan (PSP) (Sannan Keisuke)Hakuoki Shinsengumi Kitan (PS3) (Sannan Keisuke)Hakuoki Yugiroku (Sannan Keisuke)Hakuoki Zuisouroku (Sannan Keisuke)Heroes Phantasia (Zuuma)Kidou Senshi Gundam: Gundam vs. Gundam series (Kamille Bidan, Rondo Gina Sahaku)Knuckle Heads (Rob Vincent, Gregory Darrell)Lego Dimensions (X-PO)Natsuki Crisis Battle (Naoya Hondō)Phantasy Star Online 2 (Gettemhart)SD Gundam G Generation series (Kamille Bidan, Ulube Ishikawa, Rondo Gina Sahaku)Super Robot Wars series (Kamille Bidan, Son Ganlon)Tales of Destiny 2 (Karell Berselius)

Drama CDsShiawase ni Dekiru series 2 (2003) (Morita)

Unknown date3 Ji Kara Koi wo Suru series 3: 3 Ji Kara Koi wo Suru III (Yasuhisa Ooishi)Baito wa Maid!? (Shouji Toba)Baito wa Maid!? 2 - Shuubun!? Senden!? (Shouji Toba)Eien no Midori ~Nochinoomohini~ (Kazuhiko Sakuma)Gin no Requiem (Samara)Kimi ga Suki Nanosa (Hirose Okitsugu)Konoyo Ibun series 1: Konoyo Ibun (Keiichirou Minamiura)Konoyo Ibun series 2: Sono no San (Keiichirou Minamiura)Konoyo Ibun series 3: Kitsune no Yomeiri (Keiichirou Minamiura)La Vie En Rose (Masumi Ootori)Lesson XX (Shizuka Morifuji)Mirage of Blaze series 4: Washi yo, Tarega Tameni Tobu (Hakkai)MossoreOkane ga nai series 1 (Kaoruko Someya)Okane ga nai series 2: Okane Shika Nai (Kaoruko Someya)Okane ga nai series 3: Kawaige Nai (Kaoruko Someya)Okane ga nai series 4: Okane ja Kaenai (Kaoruko Someya)Shosen Kedamono series 3: Ryuuou no Hanayome (Reiga)Sora to Hara (Satoshi Arisaka)Soryamou Aideshou series 2 (Mimei Kanda)Trap series 3: Sokubaku TrapTokusatsuKamen Rider Den-O (2007) (Bloodsucker Imagin (ep. 27 - 28))Samurai Sentai Shinkenger (2009) (Ayakashi Kagekamuro (ep. 1))Tensou Sentai Goseiger (2010) (Brajira of the Messiah (eps. 45 - 50)/Buredoran of the Comet (eps. 1 - 15, 45)/Buredoran of the Chupacabra (eps. 17 - 29, 45)/Buredo-RUN of the Cyborg (eps. 39 - 45))Tensou Sentai Goseiger vs. Shinkenger: Epic on Ginmaku (2011) (Buredoran of the Chimatsuri/Buredoran of the Comet/Buredoran of the Chupacabra)Gokaiger Goseiger Super Sentai 199 Hero Great Battle (2011) (Brajira of the Messiah, Buredoran clones)Kamen Rider × Super Sentai: Super Hero Taisen (2012) (Brajira of the Messiah, Buredoran clones)Ressha Sentai ToQger (2014) (Mannenhitsu Shadow (ep. 36))Doubutsu Sentai Zyuohger (2016) (Hattena (ep. 12))Uchu Sentai Kyuranger (2017) (Mozuma (ep. 10))Kaitou Sentai Lupinranger VS Keisatsu Sentai Patranger (2018) (Namero Baccio (ep. 1, 3))

Dubbing

Live-action
Steve CarellDinner for Schmucks (Berry)Foxcatcher (John Eleuthère du Pont)The Big Short (Mark Baum)Beautiful Boy (David Sheff)August (Cyrus Ogilvie (David Bowie))The Big White (Ted Waters (Giovanni Ribisi))Cedar Rapids (Tim Lippe (Ed Helms))The Conjuring (Roger Perron (Ron Livingston))Constantine (Beeman (Max Baker))Cradle 2 the Grave (Su (Jet Li))Diana (Paul Burrell (Douglas Hodge))Genius (Niels Bohr (David Dencik))Green Book (Oleg (Dimiter D. Marinov))Houdini (Jim Collins (Evan Jones))House of Cards (Bill Shepherd (Greg Kinnear))Intolerable Cruelty (Wrigley (Paul Adelstein))Iron Man 2 (2012 TV Asahi edition) (Justin Hammer (Sam Rockwell))It (Mr. Keene (Joe Bostick))It Chapter Two (Mr. Keene (Joe Bostick))Joy Ride 2: Dead Ahead (Rusty Nail (Mark Gibbon))Look Who's Back (Adolf Hitler (Oliver Masucci))Lucy (Mr. Jang (Choi Min-sik))Monty Python's The Meaning of Life (Terry Gilliam)Night of the Living Dead (Tom Bitner (William Butler))Ready or Not (Tony Le Domas (Henry Czerny))Romeo Must Die (Han Sing (Jet Li))Scooby-Doo 2: Monsters Unleashed (Patrick Wisely (Seth Green))The Scorpion King (Arpid (Grant Heslov))Spider-Man 3 (Hoffman (Ted Raimi))Staged (Michael Sheen)Tale of Tales (King of Highhills (Toby Jones))The Thundermans (Dr. Colosso (Dana Snyder))Train to Busan (Captain of KTX (Seok-yong Jeong))Watchmen (Ozymandias (Matthew Goode))West Side Story (1990 TBS edition) (Joyboy (Robert Banas))The Wraith (1992 TV Asahi edition) (Minty (Chris Nash))

AnimationBeast Wars (Terrorsaur, Quickstrike)Chuggington (Skylar)Jellystone! (Snagglepuss)Madagascar 3: Europe's Most Wanted (Skipper)Mighty Morphin' Power Rangers (Quagmire)My Little Pony: Friendship Is Magic (Hoity Toity)The Penguins of Madagascar (Skipper)Penguins of Madagascar (Skipper)Power Rangers: Turbo (Clockster)Shrek series (Pinocchio)South Park: Bigger, Longer & Uncut (Tom the News Reporter, The Baldwin Brothers)Straight Outta Nowhere: Scooby-Doo meets Courage the Cowardly Dog (Eustace Bagge)The Simpsons (Milhouse Van Houten, Dr. Frink, Scratchy)Transformers Animated (Captain Fanzone, Soundwave)Transformers: Prime'' (Ratchet)

References

External links
Official agency profile 

1959 births
Living people
Male voice actors from Ibaraki Prefecture
Actors from Ibaraki Prefecture
Japanese male stage actors
Japanese male video game actors
Japanese male voice actors
20th-century Japanese male actors
21st-century Japanese male actors
Arts Vision voice actors